is a former Japanese football player. She played for the Japan national team.

Club career
Fujimura was born in Hyogo Prefecture on May 30, 1978. After graduating from high school, she played for Iga FC Kunoichi (1997–2005) and INAC Kobe Leonessa (2006–2009). She was selected Best Eleven in 2000 season.

National team career
On June 15, 1997, when Fujimura was 19 years old, she debuted for the Japan national team against China. She played at the 1999 and 2001 AFC Championship. She played 20 games and scored one goal for Japan until 2002.

National team statistics

References

1978 births
Living people
Association football people from Hyōgo Prefecture
Japanese women's footballers
Japan women's international footballers
Nadeshiko League players
Iga FC Kunoichi players
INAC Kobe Leonessa players
Women's association football defenders